Michael Clarkson may refer to

 Michael Clarkson (journalist) (born ), Canadian journalist
 Michael Clarkson (pastoralist) (1804–1871), early settler in the Australian Swan River Colony
 Michael Clarkson (rugby league) English rugby league player active in the 1990s and 2000s